The Kheda Satyagraha of 1918 was a satyagraha movement in the Kheda district of Gujarat in India organised by Mahatma Gandhi during the period of the British Raj. It was a major revolt in the Indian independence movement. It was the third Satyagraha movement, which was launched 4 days after the Ahmedabad mill strike. After the successful Satyagraha conducted at Champaran in Bihar, Gandhi organised the movement to support peasants who were unable to pay the revenue because of famine and plague epidemic.

Leaders 
In Gujarat, Mahatma Gandhi was chiefly the spiritual head of the struggle. He was assisted by the newly joined Satyagrahi  Sardar Vallabhbhai Patel  and other local lawyers and advocates namely Indulal Yagnik, Shankarlal Banker, Mahadev Desai, Narhari Parikh, Mohanlal Pandya and Ravi Shankar Vyas. They toured the countryside, organised the villagers and gave them political leadership and direction. Many aroused Gujaratis from the cities of Ahmedabad and Vadodara joined the organizers of the revolt, but Gandhi and Patel resisted the involvement of Indians from other provinces, seeking to keep it a purely Gujarati struggle.

The struggle 
In 1918, the British authorities had increased the taxes of Kheda region by 23%  while it was hit by Chappania famine  and others leading to cholera and plague. Nadiad collector refused any aid from 'Anavari' system of taxes in spite of  Sardar Patel and Mahatma's meetings. Patel and his colleagues organised a major tax revolt, and all the different ethnic and caste communities of (Kheda) rallied around it. The peasants of Kheda signed a petition calling for the tax for this year to be scrapped in wake of the famine. The government in Bombay rejected the charter. They warned that if the peasants did not pay, the lands and property would be confiscated and many arrested.

The tax withheld, the government's collectors and inspectors sent in thugs to seize property and cattle, while the police confiscated the lands and all agrarian property. The farmers did not resist arrest, nor retaliate to the force employed with violence. Instead, they used their cash and valuables to donate to the Gujarat Sabha which was officially organising the protest.

The revolt was astounding in terms of discipline and unity. Even when all their personal property, land and livelihood were seized, a vast majority of Kheda's farmers remained firmly united in the support of Patel. Gujaratis sympathetic to the revolt in other parts resisted the government machinery, and helped to shelter the relatives and property of the protesting peasants. Those Indians who sought to buy the confiscated lands were excluded from society. Although nationalists like Sardul Singh Caveeshar called for sympathetic revolts in other parts, Gandhi and Patel firmly rejected the idea.

Result 
The Government finally sought to foster an honourable agreement for both parties. The tax for the year in question, and the next would be suspended, and the increase in rate reduced, while all confiscated property would be returned.

People also worked in cohesion to return the confiscated lands to their rightful owners. The ones who had bought the lands seized were influenced to return them, even though the British had officially said it would stand by the buyers.

See also
 Champaran Satyagraha
 Gandhism
 Indian Independence Movement, Indian Nationalism
 My Autobiography, Or The Story Of My Experiments With Truth (1929) by M.K. Gandhi
 Mohandas Gandhi
 Non-co-operation movement
 Sardar Vallabhbhai Patel
 Satyagrah

References

Further reading
 Gandhi's first step: Champaran movement, by Shankar Dayal Singh. B.R. Pub. Corp., 1994. .

Peasant Nationalists of Gujarat : Kheda District, 1917-1934 by David Hardiman
Patel: A Life by Rajmohan Gandhi
 See Day to Day with Gandhi (volume 1), some original documents about the Kheda Satyagraha.
 Satyagraha in Champaran

External links
 Kheda Satyagraha Timeline
 Champaran Satyagraha Timeline

Gujarat in Indian independence movement
Vallabhbhai Patel
Gandhism
Kheda district
1918 in India